Frankenmuth School District is a school district headquartered in Frankenmuth, Michigan. It is a part of the Saginaw Intermediate School District and serves the Frankenmuth area. Its schools include the Preschool, List Elementary School, E.F. Rittmueller Middle School, and Frankenmuth High School.

In 2013 the Buena Vista School District closed. The Buena Vista property east of airport road was assigned to the Frankenmuth School District. Frankenmuth did not anticipate gaining any additional students because its area is rural. Historically most of the Buena Vista district's students lived closer to the City of Saginaw. In a press release the Frankenmuth district stated "The
redistricting is not likely to significantly impact the Frankenmuth District." Frankenmuth ultimately received ten additional students, who had previously lived in the Buena Vista boundary but had attended other school districts as part of the school of choice program. Those students now live in the Frankenmuth district.

Since the merger, land in Buena Vista Township east of Airport Road is in the Frankenmuth district.

References

External links

 Frankenmuth School District

School districts in Michigan
Saginaw Intermediate School District